Bobby Messano (born June 23, 1954) is an American artist, guitarist and musician.  He has recorded and toured with STARZ, Lou Gramm, Steve Winwood, Clarence Clemons, Franke and the Knockouts, and Peter Criss.

Early life and education
Messano was born in Teaneck, New Jersey and his family lived in nearby Ridgefield Park, New Jersey until he went to Washington College in Chestertown, Maryland for Music and English.

Career
In 1976, Bobby joined the band Stanky Brown who were signed to Sire Records and managed by John Scher. Stanky Brown toured with Boston, The Allman Brothers, Outlaws, and NRPS. He recorded with the band on their third and final record on Sire, called "Stanky Brown".

Messano then joined Starz who were signed to Capitol Records and Aucoin management. Starz toured for 1978-79 and released Coliseum Rock. The band toured with Ted Nugent on his Weekend Warriors Tour, Rush Hemispheres Tour, Styx and headlined shows in the U.S. Bobby then moved into session work, working with Gloria Gaynor, Peter Criss, playing on his 1982 Let Me Rock You album Michael Pare', Robey, and Benny Mardones. In 1983, Bobby was Music Director for Steve Winwood on his UK and European tour. He joined Franke & The Knockouts in 1984.

In 1985, Bobby started working with Joe Lynn Turner and Fiona and played on both their CD's Rescue You and Fiona. He toured with Joe Lynn Turner and played guitar on  Fiona's sophomore record Beyond The Pale and her 2011 release Unbroken. He then played on Glen Burtnick's Talking in Code record and toured with him. He played guitar on Clarence Clemons Hero album and played the only guitar solo on the LP. In 1987, Messano was asked to tour on the Lou Gramm (Foreigner) "Ready or Not" tour in the U.S. and Germany. He also was putting the finishing touches on his 1989 Messano CD which was released by Strategic/Relativity in 1989. In 1990 Bobby toured Germany with Robin Beck.

Bobby Messano's first Contemporary Blues CD Dominion Roads was released on Ichiban/EMI Records in 1998. The label went bankrupt in 2002 and Messano put his material on the fledgling MP3.com. He then released Dominion Roads as the retitled Holdin' Ground in 2004 on FishHead records, followed by Bobby Messano Live in Madison in 2008 on his own Prince Frog Records label that was distributed by CD Baby.

Messano was inducted into the Delaware Blues Hall of Fame in 2012 and That's Why I Don't Sing the Blues was the #1 U.S. release on the Blues Underground 2012 US Blues Rock Chart. Bobby continues to play live solo and band shows and continues to place  songs in TV and cable shows. COVID 19 has slowed his live shows down.

In July/August 2015 Love and Money was in Billboard Top 10 Blues Albums, for 6 weeks, reaching #1 on August 8. The album was also Top 50 on Three other Billboard Charts.

In August 2015 Bobby Messano Love & Money was nominated for a Blues Blast Award for Rock Blues Album of the Year

On April 15, 2017 Bad Movie was released and debuted at #1 on Sirius/XM B.B. King's Bluesville and stayed in the Top 40 on the Roots Music Charts Blues Rock Album Chart for 10 months.

On November 16, 2017 Bobby's "Bad Movie" song won a prestigious Hollywood Music in Media Award (HMMA) for Blues.

In October 2018 Bobby played his first headlining solo tour in Europe, doing shows in Holland and Belgium.

In September 2022 Bobby returned to Belgium for a successful week long tour.

Lemonade was released July 12, 2019 on Fish Head/Warner Brothers Records and garnered rave reviews and airplay.

The Songs I Never Sang was released on January 29, 2021. It is a collection of Bobby's favorite cover songs done during the COVID pandemic.

"Music & Other Sundries" Bobby's tenth solo project and his first vinyl album was released on April 15th 2022 and received 3 Grammy First Round Ballots.

The song "WHY YOU LOOKING BACK remains in heavy rotation on XM/Sirius BB King's Bluesville

In October of 2022 Bobby did a sold out week long tour of Belgium.

Every release of Bobby's since Holding Ground in 2002 has received multiple Grammy First Round ballots. As of October 2022, the total is 43 in 9 different categories.

Discography
Messano   1989
Dominion Roads 1998 (as "Bobby Messano & NBO")
Holdin' Ground   2003
Live in Madison, 2010.
That's Why I Don't Sing the Blues, 2011
Welcome to Deltaville, 2013
Love and Money, 2015
Bad Movie    2017
Messano Re-Release (Deluxe Edition) 2019
Holdin' Ground Re-Release 2019
Lemonade 2019
The Songs I Never Sang 2021
Music & Other Sundries 2022

References

External links
Official Site
"Bobby Messano | Discography | AllMusic". AllMusic.
"Bobby Messano | Credits | AllMusic". AllMusic.

Living people
People from Ridgefield Park, New Jersey
People from Teaneck, New Jersey
Guitarists from New Jersey
American male guitarists
The Shadows of Knight members
1954 births